The Canadian Luge Association is the governing federation for luge in Canada.

Luge
Luge in Canada